Riffaud is a surname. Notable people with the surname include: 

Madeleine Riffaud (born 1924), French poet
René Riffaud (1898–2007), French WWI soldier